The 1979 U.S. Clay Court Championships was a men's Grand Prix and women's Colgate Series tennis tournament. The event was held for the first time at the newly built Indianapolis Sports Center in Indianapolis in the United States and played on outdoor clay courts. It was the 11th edition of the tournament in the Open Era and was held in from August 6 through August 12, 1979. First-seeded Jimmy Connors won the men's singles title and the $25,000 first-prize money. First-seeded Chris Evert-Lloyd claimed the women's singles title and $20,000 first-prize money.

Finals

Men's singles

 Jimmy Connors defeated  Guillermo Vilas 6–1, 2–6, 6–4

Women's singles

 Chris Evert-Lloyd defeated  Evonne Goolagong Cawley 6–4, 6–3

Men's doubles

 Gene Mayer /  John McEnroe defeated  Jan Kodeš /  Tomáš Šmíd 6–4, 7–6

Women's doubles

 Kathy Jordan /  Anne Smith defeated  Penny Johnson /  Paula Smith 6–1, 6–0

References

External links 
 ATP tournament profile
 ITF tournament details – men
 ITF tournament details – women

 
U.S. Clay Court Championships
U.S. Clay Court Championships
U.S. Clay Court Championships
U.S. Clay Court Championships
U.S. Clay Court Championships